A semi-automatic shotgun is a form of shotgun that is able to fire a cartridge after every trigger squeeze, without needing to manually chamber another round.

See also

References

Shotguns
Semi-automatic shotguns
Shotguns